José "Pepe" Pérez Serer (born 4 May 1966 in Quart de les Valls, Valencia, Spain) is a former footballer who was most recently the manager of Kairat in Almaty, Kazakhstan.

Manager statistics

Honours
Barcelona
UEFA Cup Winners' Cup: 1988–89

References

1966 births
Living people
Spanish footballers
Spanish football managers
Spanish expatriate football managers
FC Kairat managers
Expatriate football managers in Kazakhstan
Association football defenders